POZ-, AT hook-, and zinc finger-containing protein 1 is a protein that in humans is encoded by the PATZ1 gene.

Function 

The protein encoded by this gene contains an AT-hook DNA binding motif, which usually binds to other DNA binding structures to play an important role in chromatin modeling and transcription regulation. Its Poz domain is thought to function as a site for protein-protein interaction and is required for transcriptional repression, and the zinc-fingers comprise the DNA binding domain. Since the encoded protein has typical features of a transcription factor, it is postulated to be a repressor of gene expression. In small round cell sarcoma, this gene is fused to EWS by a small inversion of 22q, then the hybrid is thought to be translocated (t(1;22)(p36.1;q12). The rearrangement of chromosome 22 involves intron 8 of EWS and exon 1 of this gene creating a chimeric sequence containing the transactivation domain of EWS fused to zinc finger domain of this protein. This is a distinct example of an intra-chromosomal rearrangement of chromosome 22. Four alternatively spliced transcript variants are described for this gene.

Interactions 

PATZ1 has been shown to interact with:
 Androgen receptor,
 Microphthalmia-associated transcription factor,  and
 RNF4.

References

Further reading